George Henry Abbott (1867–1942) was an Australian surgeon, President of the New South Wales branch of the British Medical Association, President of the Royal Australian Historical Society and a fellow of the University of Sydney Senate.

Biography

Early life
Abbott was the son of Joseph Abbott, wool-broker and politician, and Margaret Ann Bennett. He was one of six sons and three daughters. At birth his family lived in Glebe before moving to Newtown where his father was an alderman. Around 1880 the family moved to the newly fashionable suburb of Croydon. Abbott was educated at Newington College (1881–1884) and graduated in arts and medicine from the University of Sydney.

Medical career
Abbott practiced as a surgeon in Macquarie Street, Sydney and lectured in clinical surgery at Royal Prince Alfred Hospital from 1911 to 1927. On the foundation of the Royal Australian College of Surgeons he was appointed as a Fellow. For many years, Abbott served as a councillor of the New South Wales branch of the British Medical Association and then was elected president.

Community involvement
He was a keen numismatist and served as President of the Royal Australian Historical Society from 1934 to 1936 and as a Fellow of the Sydney University Senate from 1919 to 1929. Abbott served as President of the Old Newingtonians' Union in 1901.

References

External links
 Ruth Teale, Abbott, Joseph (1843–1903), Australian Dictionary of Biography, Volume 3, MUP, 1969, pp 3–4.

1867 births
1942 deaths
Australian surgeons
People educated at Newington College
Old Newingtonians' Union presidents
Sydney Medical School alumni
Australian numismatists